The 1891–92 season was the fourth season of football by Celtic, this marked the second season where Celtic took part in the Scottish Football League, they also competed in the Scottish Cup, Glasgow Merchants Charity Cup and Glasgow Cup.

Pre-season and Friendlies

Competitions

Scottish Football League

Scottish Cup

Glasgow Cup

Glasgow Merchants Charity Cup

Notes

References

Celtic F.C. seasons
Celtic